Donatas Nakrošius (born 17 February 1991) is a Lithuanian professional footballer who plays for Polish club Garbarnia Kraków. He spent most of his career so far in the Polish third-tier II liga.

Early life

His father being a handball player, Nakrošius practiced basketball as a child and was part of his school teams.

Poland

Able to speak some Polish, the Lithuanian defender quickly acculturated into Poland and Rzeszów upon getting there in 2012, making 34 appearances and scoring 1 goal.

He has stated that the main problem with football in Latvia and Lithuania is that the clubs do not know how to manage their money and sometimes do not have sponsors.

Personal life
Meeting his wife, Kasia, in Rzeszów, Nakrošius has one son.

References

External links 
 
 at Footballdatabase.eu

1991 births
Sportspeople from Panevėžys
Living people
Lithuanian footballers
Lithuania youth international footballers
Lithuania under-21 international footballers
Association football defenders
FBK Kaunas footballers
Stal Rzeszów players
FK Atlantas players
Odra Opole players
FK Klaipėdos Granitas players
Polonia Warsaw players
MKS Kluczbork players
Olimpia Grudziądz players
Górnik Łęczna players
Garbarnia Kraków players
A Lyga players
II liga players
Lithuanian expatriate footballers
Expatriate footballers in Poland
Lithuanian expatriate sportspeople in Poland